GMER is a software tool written by a Polish researcher Przemysław Gmerek, for detecting and removing rootkits. It runs on Microsoft Windows and has support for Windows NT, 2000, XP, Vista, 7, 8 and 10. With version 2.0.18327 full support for Windows x64 is added.

At the time of first release in 2004 it introduced innovative rootkit detection techniques and quickly gained popularity for its effectiveness. It was incorporated into a few antivirus tools including Avast! antivirus and SDFix.

For several months in 2006 and 2007, the tool's website was the target of heavy DDoS attacks attempting to block its downloads.

References

External links
 

Spyware removal
Windows security software
Antivirus software
Rootkit detection software